Berwick-upon-Tweed is a parliamentary constituency in Northumberland represented in the House of Commons of the UK Parliament since 2015 by Anne-Marie Trevelyan, a Conservative.

It was a parliamentary borough in the county of Northumberland of the House of Commons of England from 1512 to 1706, then of the House of Commons of Great Britain from 1707 to 1800 and of the House of Commons of the United Kingdom from 1801 to 1885. It returned two Members of Parliament (MPs), elected by the bloc vote system.

It has been a county constituency since 1885, electing one MP under the first-past-the-post system.

Profile 
The constituency of Berwick-upon-Tweed is in the county of Northumberland.  It includes as its northernmost point the town of Berwick-upon-Tweed and stretches south to include the towns of Alnwick and Amble — the Northumberland coast forms its long eastern boundary.  Its length is roughly 50 miles (80 km) and its area is 2,310 square kilometres.

Predominantly rural in character, this constituency is the most northerly in England and is relatively sparsely populated.

History 
Berwick had been intermittently represented in Scottish Parliaments but it is thought that it was first enfranchised as an English borough between 1491 and 1512.

It was unaffected by the Reform Act 1832 and continued to elect two MPs until it was abolished by the Redistribution of Seats Act 1885. The 1885 Act re-constituted the constituency as one of four divisions of Northumberland, each electing one MP.

Boundaries

1832–1885 
The contents of the parliamentary borough, as defined by the Parliamentary Boundaries Act 1832, were:The Parish of Berwick, and the Respective Townships of Tweedmouth and Spittal.

1885–1918 
The contents of the county division, as defined by the Redistribution of Seats Act 1885, were:The Sessional Divisions of Bamburgh, Coquetdale East (part), Coquetdale North, Glendale, and Norhamshire and Islandshire; and the Municipal Borough of Berwick-upon-Tweed.

1918–1950 

 the Municipal Borough of Berwick upon Tweed
 the Urban Districts of Alnwick, Amble and Rothbury
 the Rural Districts of Alnwick, Belford, Glendale, Norham and Islandshires, and Rothbury.

Gained small areas to south from Wansbeck (Amble) and Hexham (Rothbury).

1950–1983 

 the Municipal Borough of Berwick-upon-Tweed;
 the Urban Districts of Alnwick and Amble;
 the Rural Districts of Alnwick, Belford, Glendale, Norham and Islandshires, and Rothbury.

No change (the Urban District of Rothbury had been absorbed into the Rural District).

1983–present 

 the District of Alnwick
 the Borough of Berwick-upon-Tweed
 in the Borough of Castle Morpeth, the wards of Chevington, Ellington, Hartburn, Longhorsley, Lynemouth and Ulgham.

Contents changed following reorganisation of local authorities in 1974. The seat was expanded southwards, adding the (rural) wards in Castle Morpeth Borough, previously part of the abolished constituency of Morpeth.

2007 boundary review 
In the fifth periodic boundary review of parliamentary representation in Northumberland, which came into effect for the 2010 general election, the contents of the existing Berwick constituency were unchanged and the Boundary Commission for England made only minor changes to take account of ward boundary changes. A proposal to rename the historic seat "Berwick-upon-Tweed and Mid Northumberland" was rejected: whilst it is geographically accurate, it was thought unwieldy.

In 2009, a further government reorganisation resulted in the abolition of all local government boroughs and districts in Northumberland and the establishment of the county as a unitary authority. However, this has not affected the current constituency boundaries.

Political history
Rural in nature, sparse of population and with agriculture as a major source of employment, Berwick-upon-Tweed has never elected a Labour candidate, one of two constituencies in the north east of England not to have done so. The closest Labour have ever come to winning the seat was at the 1966 general election, where they finished just 4,373 votes behind incumbent Conservative MP Antony Lambton.

The area has been notable for its Liberal politicians – both Sir William Beveridge (influential in the formation of the National Health Service) and Edward Grey (Foreign Secretary at the beginning of World War I, best remembered for the "lamps are going out all over Europe...." remark) have served this constituency.

It was represented by Liberal Democrat Sir Alan Beith from 1973 (formerly Liberal) until his retirement in 2015, when it was gained by the Conservative candidate Anne-Marie Trevelyan. Beith was first elected at a by-election, required as a result of the resignation of the then incumbent MP Antony Lambton (Conservative), who had been caught up in a scandal involving call girls, marijuana and a tabloid newspaper.

In 1923, Mabel Philipson, a former music hall actress, took over the seat as a Conservative, when her husband was forced to resign. In doing so she became only the third female MP to sit in the House of Commons since female members became legal five years previously.

Members of Parliament
The seat has sent members to Parliament since its enfranchisement by Henry VIII. It initially sent two members; this was reduced to one in 1885.

MPs before 1660

MPs 1660–1885

MPs since 1885

Elections

Elections in the 2020s

Elections in the 2010s

Back to elections

Elections in the 2000s

Back to elections

Elections in the 1990s

Back to elections

Elections in the 1980s

Back to elections

Elections in the 1970s

Back to elections

Elections in the 1960s

Back to elections

Elections in the 1950s

Back to elections

Elections in the 1940s

Back to elections

Elections in the 1930s

Back to elections

Elections in the 1920s

Back to elections

Elections in the 1910s

Back to elections

Elections in the 1900s

Back to elections

Elections in the 1890s

Back to elections

Elections in the 1880s

 Caused by Marjoribanks elevation to the peerage, becoming Lord Tweedmouth.

 Caused by Strutt's elevation to the peerage, becoming Lord Belper.

 

Back to elections

Elections from 1832 to 1880

 

 
 

 

 
 

 

 

 

 Caused by Gordon's death.

 
 

 Caused by Earle's resignation.

 

 
 
 

 
  
 

 

 

 

 Caused by the 1852 election being declared void on petition, due to bribery.

 
  
 

 

 

 
 
 

  
 
 

  

 
 

 

 Caused by Donkin's appointment as Surveyor-General of the Ordnance

Elections before 1832

Back to elections

See also
 List of parliamentary constituencies in Northumberland
 History of parliamentary constituencies and boundaries in Northumberland

Notes

References

Sources
 
 
 
  
 
 Robert Beatson, A Chronological Register of Both Houses of Parliament (London: Longman, Hurst, Res & Orme, 1807)  A Chronological Register of Both Houses of the British Parliament, from the Union in 1708, to the Third Parliament of the United Kingdom of Great Britain and Ireland, in 1807

Parliamentary constituencies in Northumberland
Constituencies of the Parliament of the United Kingdom established in 1512
Berwick-upon-Tweed